The 1996 Algerian Cup Final was the 32nd final of the Algerian Cup. The final took place on July 5, 1996, at Stade 5 Juillet 1962 in Algiers. MC Oran beat USM Blida 1-0 to win their 4th Algerian Cup.

Road to final

Pre-match

Details

References

Cup
Algeria
Algerian Cup Finals